After Many Years is a 1930 British crime film directed by Lawrence Huntington and starring Henry Thompson, Nancy Kenyon and the Savoy Havana Band. It was made as a quota quickie for released by the Hollywood studio MGM. In the film, a murdered policeman's son tracks down the murderer in Peru.

References

Bibliography
Chibnall, Steve. Quota Quickies: The Birth of the British 'B' Film. British Film Institute, 2007.
Low, Rachael. Filmmaking in 1930s Britain. George Allen & Unwin, 1985.
Wood, Linda. British Films, 1927–1939. British Film Institute, 1986.

External links

1930 films
British crime films
British black-and-white films
1930 crime films
1930s English-language films
Films directed by Lawrence Huntington
Films set in Peru
Metro-Goldwyn-Mayer films
1930s British films